Wambrechies is a commune in the Nord department, in the region Hauts-de-France, in northern France. It is part of the European Metropolis of Lille. It has a population of around 10,600 (2019).

Geography
Wambrechies is situated to the north of Lille, it is bordered by the neighbouring communes of Marquette-lez-Lille (to the southeast), Saint André-lez-Lille (to the south), Quesnoy-sur-Deûle (to the northwest) and Bondues (to the northeast). The Deûle canal runs from north to south through the town.

Heraldry

Population

Twin towns
Kempen, Germany since 1972.

See also
Communes of the Nord department

References

Communes of Nord (French department)
French Flanders